This is the full table of the medal table of the 1952 Summer Olympics held in Helsinki, Finland.

These rankings sort by the number of gold medals earned by a country. The number of silvers is taken into consideration next and then the number of bronze. If, after the above, countries are still tied, equal ranking is given and they are listed alphabetically. This follows the system used by the IOC, IAAF and BBC.

External links
 
 
 

Medal count
1952